Ryan Ferhaoui (born 31 May 1997) is a French professional footballer who plays as a midfielder for Laval.

Career
Ferhaoui is a youth product of the academies of Montpellier, Lattes, and Ajaccio. He began his senior career with Sète, and transferred to Laval on 18 June 2021. He helped Laval win the 2021–22 Championnat National and achieved promotion into the Ligue 2 for the 2022-23 season. He made his professional debut with Laval in a 2–1 Ligue 2 loss to EA Guingamp on 6 August 2022.

Personal life
Ferhaoui is the son of the retired Algerian international footballer Abdelkader Ferhaoui.

Honours
Laval
Championnat National: 2021–22

References

External links
 

1997 births
Living people
Footballers from Montpellier
French footballers
French sportspeople of Algerian descent
Stade Lavallois players
FC Sète 34 players
Ligue 2 players
Championnat National players
Championnat National 2 players
Championnat National 3 players
Association football midfielders